Canada competed at the 2011 World Aquatics Championships in Shanghai, China between July 16 and 31, 2011. Margie Schuett was the chef de mission.

Medalists

| width="78%" align="left" valign="top" |

| width="22%" align="left" valign="top" |

| width="22%" align="left" valign="top" |

Diving

The Canada Cup diving grand prix held in Montreal between April 28 and May 1, 2011 will be the qualification tournament. Canada diving, the national governing body set qualification standards for athletes to qualify. For an athlete to qualify they must be in top 2 (Canadians) at the tournament and have reached the minimum score. Canada has qualified 9 athletes in diving.

Men

Women

Withdrawn due to injury
Alexandre Despatie – 3 meter synchro

Open water swimming

Athletes that make up the team will be decided at the US 2011 10K Open Water National Championships & Team Trials in Fort Myers Beach, Florida, United States. After the selection event six swimmers were selected to compete, four men and two women.

Men

Women

Mixed

Swimming

Canada's team for these championships was selected from the World Championship trials held in Victoria, British Columbia between March 30 and April 2, 2011. 33 athletes will represent Canada in Shanghai along with 10 coaches.

The provisional events per athlete:

Men

Women

 * raced in heats only

Synchronized swimming

Canada will send a team of 12 synchronized swimmers.

Women

Reserves
Gabrielle Cardinal
Erin Wilson

Water polo

Men

Canada's men's team qualified by defeating Brazil and Argentina in a qualifier in January 2011 in Victoria, British Columbia. Canada's men's team finished an all-time high of eighth place at the previous championships in Rome, Italy. For these championships, Canada has been grouped with Brazil, Japan and defending bronze medalist Croatia. The team was announced on July 8, 2011. The team ended up finishing in tenth place.
Team

Robin Randall – Captain
Constantine Kudaba
Omar Touni
Nicholas Bicari
Justin Beaconsfield
Scott Robinson
John Conway
Kevin Graham
Devon Diggle
Dusko Dakic
Oliver Vikalo
Jared McElroy
Dusan Aleksic

Group C

Playoff round

Classification 9–12

Ninth place game

Women

Canada's women's team qualified by finishing in top two teams at the 2010 World League who had not yet qualified. Canada's women's team finished with the silver medals and second position at the previous championships in Rome, Italy. For these championships, Canada has been grouped with Australia, New Zealand and Uzbekistan. Canada's final roster includes eighteen athletes. The team was announced on July 8, 2011. The team finished in eight place.

Team

Krystina Alogbo – Captain
Joëlle Békhazi
Tara Campbell
Emily Csikos
Monika Eggens
Whitney Genoway
Marissa Janssens
Katrina Monton
Dominique Perreault
Marina Radu
Rachel Riddell
Christine Robinson
Stephanie Valin
Anna Yelizarova

Group B

Quarterfinals

Classification 5–8

Seventh place game

References

Nations at the 2011 World Aquatics Championships
2011
World Aquatics Championships